The Great Western Railway (GWR) 3150 Class was a class of 2-6-2T side tank steam locomotive.

History
Churchward based the 3150 class on his  3100 (later 5100) class. They used the larger and heavier Standard 4 boiler and so had greater boiler capacity, but were consequently heavier and thus restricted to Red routes. They were principally heavy suburban passenger traffic engines. Five of the class were rebuilt into the  Collett 3100 Class. None of the class were preserved.

See also
GWR 3100/5100 Class (1906)
GWR 5101 Class
GWR 6100 Class
 GWR 3100 Class (1938)
GWR 8100 Class
 List of GWR standard classes with two outside cylinders

References

External links
 The Great Western Archive
 Class 3150 Details at Rail UK

2-6-2T locomotives
3150
Railway locomotives introduced in 1906